Nezhawka is a village in the Chervyen District of Minsk Region, Belarus. It is close to the city of Smalyavichy and the Minsk International Airport.

Geography
Latitude: 53.8333333°, Longitude: 28.1833333°

References

See also
 Chervyen District
 Minsk Region
 Belarus

Populated places in Minsk Region
Chervyen District
Villages in Belarus